Joseba Agirre López (born 17 March 1964) is a Spanish retired footballer who played as a midfielder, and a current manager. He mainly managed Athletic Bilbao women's team.

References

External links

Joseba Agirre profile at Athletic Bilbao

1964 births
Living people
People from Greater Bilbao
Spanish footballers
Footballers from the Basque Country (autonomous community)
Association football midfielders
La Liga players
Segunda División B players
Segunda División players
Bilbao Athletic footballers
RC Celta de Vigo players
Athletic Bilbao footballers
Sestao Sport Club footballers
Real Burgos CF footballers
Spanish football managers
Deportivo Alavés players
Athletic Bilbao non-playing staff
Sportspeople from Biscay
Athletic Club Femenino managers
Primera División (women) managers